Gabriel Peak may refer to:
 Gabriel Peak (Antarctica)
 Gabriel Peak (Washington)